The  is a theatre in Chūō, Tokyo, Japan. It was originally constructed in 1873. It presents kabuki and Western stage plays.

History
The theatre first opened in the district of Hisamatsu-chô as the Kishô-za in 1873. Six years later it reopened under the name of Hisamatsu-za. In February 1885 it opened under a third name, Chitose-za, but burned down in 1890. In November 1893 it was rebuilt as the Meiji-za, the name that it holds today.

In 1904 the Meiji-za underwent renovations, only to be burned down in the 1923 Great Kantō earthquake. Until the Meiji-za was rebuilt in Hama-chô, the Suehiro-za, a small theater in the Azabu Jûban district, served as a temporary replacement.
The Meiji-za was burned down in the bombings of World War II, but reopened in December 1950. After a fire in 1957, it was reopened the next year.

The Meiji-za put on two especially grand kabuki performances in March and April 1993 to celebrate three years of extensive renovations.

In 2023, the Meija-za opened its 150th anniversary season with its first ever original musical, CESARE ~ Creator of Destruction ~, based on Fuyumi Soryo's manga of the same name. For this production, an orchestra pit was created there for the first time in the theatre's history.

References

Buildings and structures in Chūō, Tokyo
Kabuki theatres
Theatres completed in 1873
Theatres in Tokyo
1873 establishments in Japan